Al-Sharqiya Sport Club, is an Iraqi football team based in Wasit, that plays in Iraq Division Three.

Managerial history
 Majed Kadhim Al-Badri

See also 
 2020–21 Iraq FA Cup

References

External links
 Al-Sharqiya SC on Goalzz.com
 Iraq Clubs- Foundation Dates

2003 establishments in Iraq
Association football clubs established in 2003
Football clubs in Wasit